

Codes

References

E